This article is about the particular significance of the year 1851 to Wales and its people.

Incumbents

Lord Lieutenant of Anglesey – Henry Paget, 1st Marquess of Anglesey 
Lord Lieutenant of Brecknockshire – John Lloyd Vaughan Watkins
Lord Lieutenant of Caernarvonshire – Peter Drummond-Burrell, 22nd Baron Willoughby de Eresby (until 7 March); Sir Richard Williams-Bulkeley, 10th Baronet (from 7 March) 
Lord Lieutenant of Cardiganshire – William Edward Powell
Lord Lieutenant of Carmarthenshire – George Rice, 3rd Baron Dynevor 
Lord Lieutenant of Denbighshire – Robert Myddelton Biddulph   
Lord Lieutenant of Flintshire – Sir Stephen Glynne, 9th Baronet
Lord Lieutenant of Glamorgan – Christopher Rice Mansel Talbot (from 4 May)
Lord Lieutenant of Merionethshire – Edward Lloyd-Mostyn, 2nd Baron Mostyn
Lord Lieutenant of Monmouthshire – Capel Hanbury Leigh
Lord Lieutenant of Montgomeryshire – Charles Hanbury-Tracy, 1st Baron Sudeley
Lord Lieutenant of Pembrokeshire – Sir John Owen, 1st Baronet
Lord Lieutenant of Radnorshire – John Walsh, 1st Baron Ormathwaite

Bishop of Bangor – Christopher Bethell 
Bishop of Llandaff – Alfred Ollivant 
Bishop of St Asaph – Thomas Vowler Short 
Bishop of St Davids – Connop Thirlwall

Events
May 
 David Davies (Llandinam) marries Margaret Jones of Llanfair Caereinion.
24 September – Vale of Neath Railway opens from Neath to Aberdare.
27 August – William Bulkeley Hughes hosts a banquet at Bangor for Robert Stephenson.
 Richard Fothergill III is prosecuted for running a "truck shop" at Aberdare.

Arts and literature

New books
John Blackwell (Alun) – Ceinion Alun (posthumously published)
Richard Williams Morgan – A Tragedy of Powys Castle

Music
Thomas Jones (Gogrynwr) – Gweddi Habacuc (cantata)
John Ambrose Lloyd – Teyrnasoedd y Ddaear (anthem)
John Owen (Owain Alaw)
Deborah a Barac (anthem)
Gweddi Habacuc (cantata)

Births
8 February – Sir Marteine Lloyd, 2nd Baronet (d. 1933)
10 March – William Haggar, pioneer of the film industry (d. 1925)
24 March – Robert Ambrose Jones (Emrys ap Iwan) (d. 1906)
15 June – Ernest Howard Griffiths, physicist (d. 1932)
8 July – Sir Arthur Evans, archaeologist (d. 1941)
12 July – Elizabeth Phillips Hughes, promoter of women's education (died 1925)
27 December – Percy Gilchrist, industrialist

Deaths
1 January – George Insole, English-born coal shipper, 60
6 April – William Morgan Kinsey, travel writer, 62?
8 April – John Parry (Bardd Alaw), harpist and composer, 75
30 June
Thomas Phillips, founder of Llandovery College, 80
William Saunders, Welsh-language poet, 45 
17 July – Aneurin Owen, historian, 58
13 August – Benjamin Gibson, classical scholar, younger brother of John Gibson, 40
22 November – Thomas Morgan, navy chaplain, 81

References

 
Wales